Rosie Beaton is an Australian radio announcer, best known for her work at Australian youth radio station Triple J.

Radio career

In 2001, Beaton was appointed host of Triple J's evening music program Super Request which aired weekdays at 6pm. Earlier, Beaton co-hosted the Net 50 program with Justin Wilcomes on its debut in 1999.

Rosie also hosts Billboard on Qantas' Q Radio program Billboard, this can be heard while flying on Qantas. Beaton replaced Mike Hammond.

In December 2011, Beaton resigned from Super Request to look for new opportunities. Rosie presented her last Super Request show on 9 December live from the University of Sydney's Manning Bar in Sydney, though will be returning to Triple J in a new capacity in 2012.

From March 2012 Rosie is working as a presenter on triple j unearthed digital radio, interviewing young bands that feature on triplejunearthed.com from Tues-Fridays at 4pm-6pm as her own radio show, presented and produced by Rosie

Rosie Beaton occasionally fills in as Evenings radio presenter with Sydney ABC radio station 702 ABC Sydney.

In December 2014 Rosie left the ABC, but often presents shows for Double J on a casual basis. Rosie is a licensed marriage celebrant in demand for couples all over Australia.

TV career 

Beaton has also occasionally appeared on Fly TV and other ABC TV shows.

From 2006 she also hosts triple j tv Saturday on the ABC, which broadcasts the music videos to the 20 most requested songs from Super Request during the prior week.

Rosie occasionally appears on various shows on Foxtel - `The Playlist and Mars Venus'

As of February 2012, Rosie is a regular guest on Network Ten's Breakfast. Following Breakfast's axing in November 2012, Rosie is now a regular on The Project.

Music Programmer & Media Trainer 
Rosie often works with young bands for record companies to help artists polish their interview skills. Rosie was Senior Music Curator for Amazon Music ANZ from August 2018 to Mid 2019.

Triple J announcers
Australian women radio presenters
Year of birth missing (living people)
Living people